Stéphane Bahier (born 7 May 1975 in Ernée, France) is a triathlete handisport, France, Europe and World champion, in paratriathlon, TR2/PT2 category.

Biography

Stéphane Bahier has a degree in physical education and he is a professor in the Ministry of Education. He also has a degree in judo and participate in several sports as an amateur, including triathlon, mountain biking, cycling, and cross country up to 2003.

In May 2004, he had a very serious road accident, when his lower members were severely injured. Albeit several important chirurgies he had to have his right leg amputated at his thigh level. In 2005, he went through a reeducation program so as to reassume his sport activities as soon as possible.

He participated at the Pekin paralympic games in 2008 as a cyclist running against-the-watch and in line, where he wins the 6th and the 7th places. He is again a member of the French team at the paralympic games of Rio in 2016, in paratriathlon, sport which appears for the first time during these games.

Prize list

Most important results (podium) in national and international paratriathlon circuits since 2012

2016	World championship PT2     Nederlands          3rd place

2016    World championship PT2      Portugal           1st place
	
2015	World championship PT2	     USA              2nd place
 
2015	France championship PT2	    France            1st place
 
2014	World championship PT2         USA             3rd place 
 
2013	World championship TR2          UK             1st place
  
2012	World championship TR2      New Zealand        1st place

References

External links 
 
 
 
 

1975 births
Living people
French male triathletes
French male cyclists
Paratriathletes of France
Paralympic cyclists of France
Cyclists at the 2008 Summer Paralympics
Cyclists at the 2016 Summer Paralympics